This is a list of spouses and partners of Icelandic presidents. Eliza Reid is the spouse of incumbent president Guðni Th. Jóhannesson.

List
† – denotes that the person died while the president was in office

References

Iceland